Andrei Vladimirovich Krivov (born 24 September 1976) is a Russian professional football functionary and a former defensive midfielder who played for FC Rotor Volgograd in Russia and Gaziantepspor in the Turkish Süper Lig.

Career stats

External links
 Profile at TFF.org

1976 births
Living people
People from Morshansk
Russian footballers
Russia under-21 international footballers
Russia youth international footballers
Gaziantepspor footballers
FC Rotor Volgograd players
FC Khimki players
FC Ural Yekaterinburg players
Association football midfielders
Russian expatriate footballers
Expatriate footballers in Turkey
Russian Premier League players
Süper Lig players
Sportspeople from Tambov Oblast